Albanian International School is an English-language international school in Tirana, Albania.

Curriculum
The Albanian International School (AIS) curriculum adheres to the Common Core Standards developed in the United States with slight modifications.

Academics 
The Albanian International School utilizes the NWEA MAP Growth evaluation for student growth assessment. AIS remains the only international school in Tirana to both test and publicly share its students international test scores.

The Albanian International School is also the first and only school in the Balkans to utilize Standards Based Grading (SBG) for its English and Math class assessments.  SBG refers to systems of instruction, assessment, grading, and academic reporting that are based on students demonstrating understanding or mastery of the knowledge and skills they are expected to learn as they progress through their education.

Facilities 
The school is centrally located on the outskirts of downtown Tirana and is housed in the former French Embassy.  The building was substantially renovated and improved over the last two years with small improvements ongoing. AIS has recently expanded the kindergarten classroom, added to the cafeteria, added a master fire alarm system, added an external emergency stairwell, added surveillance cameras, instructional technology to accommodate the MAP testing, and two main entry office spaces. The outdoor space fills one side of a city block directly across from the US Embassy, with high stucco walls topped with wrought-iron fencing surrounding the perimeter, with two large gates for vehicles to pass through. The perimeter defines a U-shaped, paved driveway that loops around the building allowing easy access for parents to enter and exit when picking up their children. There is a large outdoor playing field covered with artificial turf and enclosed with chain-link fencing all around and netting over the top. This field is fitted for soccer, basketball and volleyball.

Outside next to the playing court is a small playground for preschool with swings, slides, playhouse, and other pre-school equipment. The school is licensed by the Ministry of Education and meets or exceeds the requirements of the Albanian Ministry of Education for education, health safety, and labor regulations.

References

External links

International schools in Albania
Education in Tirana
Buildings and structures in Tirana
Schools in Tirana